Geistesgeschichte (from German Geist, "spirit" or "mind" [here connoting the metaphysical realm, in contradistinction to the material], and Geschichte, "history") is a concept in the history of ideas denoting the branch of study concerned with the undercurrents of cultural manifestations, within the history of a people, that are peculiar to a specific timeframe.

The term is a largely untranslatable term, sometimes translated as "intellectual history" or "history of ideas", and sometimes used synonymously with Problemgeschichte.  The branch of study it denotes is often seen as having been inspired by the type of work done by Wilhelm Dilthey and his followers.

See also
 Wilhelm Dilthey
 Max Dvořák
 Erich Heller

References

Historiography
German words and phrases
Wilhelm Dilthey